Uchu Tomita (born 28 February 1989) is a Japanese Paralympic swimmer who represented Japan at the 2020 Summer Paralympics.

Career
Tomita represented Japan at the 2020 Summer Paralympics and won silver medals in the 100 metre butterfly S11 and 400 metre freestyle S11 events, and a bronze medal in the 200 metre individual medley SM11 event.

References

1989 births
Living people
Paralympic swimmers of Japan
Medalists at the World Para Swimming Championships
Swimmers at the 2020 Summer Paralympics
Medalists at the 2020 Summer Paralympics
Paralympic medalists in swimming
Paralympic silver medalists for Japan
Paralympic bronze medalists for Japan
People from Kumamoto
Japanese male freestyle swimmers
Japanese male butterfly swimmers
Japanese male medley swimmers
S11-classified Paralympic swimmers
21st-century Japanese people